Dee Dee Bridgewater (née Denise Garrett, May 27, 1950) is an American jazz singer and actress. She is a three-time Grammy Award-winning singer-songwriter, as well as a Tony Award-winning stage actress. For 23 years, she was the host of National Public Radio's syndicated radio show JazzSet with Dee Dee Bridgewater. She is a United Nations Goodwill Ambassador for the Food and Agriculture Organization.

Biography
Born Denise Eileen Garrett in Memphis, Tennessee, she was raised Catholic in Flint, Michigan. Her father, Matthew Garrett, was a jazz trumpeter and teacher at Manassas High School, and through his playing, she was exposed to jazz early on. At the age of sixteen, she was a member of a Rock and R&B trio, singing in clubs in Michigan. At 18, she studied at Michigan State University before she went to the University of Illinois at Urbana-Champaign. With the school's jazz band, she toured the Soviet Union in 1969.

The next year, she met trumpeter Cecil Bridgewater, and after their marriage, they moved to New York City, where Cecil played in Horace Silver's band. In the early 1970s, Bridgewater joined the Thad Jones-Mel Lewis Jazz Orchestra as lead vocalist. This marked the beginning of her jazz career, and she performed with many of the great jazz musicians of the time, such as Sonny Rollins, Dizzy Gillespie, Dexter Gordon, Max Roach, Rahsaan Roland Kirk, Wayne Garfield,  and others. She performed at the Monterey Jazz Festival in 1973. In 1974, her first solo album, entitled Afro Blue, appeared, and she performed on Broadway in the musical The Wiz. For her role as Glinda the Good Witch she won a Tony Award in 1975 as "Best Featured Actress", and the musical also won the 1976 Grammy Award for Best Musical Show Album.

She subsequently appeared in several other stage productions. After touring France in 1984 with the musical Sophisticated Ladies, she moved to Paris in 1986. The same year saw her in Lady Day, as Billie Holiday, for which role she was nominated for the Laurence Olivier Award, as well as recording the song "Precious Thing" with Ray Charles, featured on her album Victim of Love.

In the late 1980s and early 1990s, she returned from the world of Pop and Contemporary R&B to Jazz. She performed at the Sanremo Music Festival in Italy and the Montreux Jazz Festival in 1990, and four years later, she finally collaborated with Horace Silver, whom she had long admired, and released the album Love and Peace: A Tribute to Horace Silver. Performed also at the San Francisco Jazz Festival (1996). Her 1997 tribute album Dear Ella won her the 1998 Grammy Award for Best Jazz Vocal Album, and the 1998 album Live at Yoshi's was also worth a Grammy nomination. Performed again at the Monterey Jazz Festival (1998). She has also explored on This Is New (2002) the songs of Kurt Weill, and, on her next album J'ai deux amours (2005), the French Classics.

Her album Red Earth, released in 2007, features Africa-inspired themes and contributions by numerous musicians from Mali. Performed at the San Francisco Jazz Festival (2007). On December 8, 2007, she performed with the Terence Blanchard Quintet at the John F. Kennedy Center for the Performing Arts in Washington, D.C. She tours frequently, including overseas gigs around the world. October 16, 2009 found her opening the Shanghai JZ Jazz Festival, in which she sang tunes associated with Ella Fitzgerald, along with Ellington compositions and other jazz standards.

As a Goodwill Ambassador to the United Nations’ Food and Agriculture Organization, Bridgewater continues to appeal for international solidarity to finance global grassroots projects in the fight against world hunger. Awarded Honorary Doctorates from University of Michigan and Berklee College of Music, Bridgewater makes a concerted effort to mentor and nurture young artists.

In April 2017, Bridgewater was the recipient of an NEA Jazz Masters Award with honors bestowed at the Kennedy Center in Washington, D.C. and in 2018 was awarded the 2018 Maria Fisher Founder's Award by the Thelonious Monk/Hancock Institute of Jazz. She is currently on tour worldwide in support of her latest CD, “Memphis...Yes, I'm Ready”.

Philanthropy
Bridgewater has a long history of philanthropy and advocacy. Her appointment as UN Goodwill Ambassador to the FAO, as well as the ASCAP Foundation Champion Award, along with her ongoing work with UNESCO for World Jazz Day coupled with her recognition as a Doris Duke Artist set in motion her founding of The Woodshed Network. Launched in 2019, The Woodshed Network was conceived as a program for Women in Jazz, to provide professional support and accelerate careers through mentorship, knowledge sharing and community interaction. The program is a collaboration between Dee Dee Bridgewater as Artistic Director, (DDB Productions + DDB Records), Tulani Bridgewater-Kowalski as Co-Artistic Director & Program Curator (Bridgewater Artists Management), and 651 ARTS with funding by the Doris Duke Charitable Foundation. The first year's alumna include Erinn Alexis (sax), Lakecia Benjamin (sax), Darynn Dean (vocals), Sarah Hanahan (sax), Kennedy (vocals), Amina Scott (bass), and Sequoia Snyder (piano). Program mentors included Sheila Jordan, Arthel Neville, Marilyn Rosen (Marilyn Rosen Presents), Alisse Kingsley (Muse Media Public Relations), Maureen McFadden (DL Media), Jett Galindo (The Bakery LA), Shirazette Tinnin, Fanny Delsol (Motema), Simma Levine (NJ PAC), Robin Tomchin (Motema), Stacie Negas (Sony Masterworks), and Lisa Jefferson (LRJ Account Management) with Bridgewater-Kowalski serving as moderator.

Acting
Dee Dee had appeared in such films as the 1979 film The Fish That Saved Pittsburgh and the 1984 film The Brother from Another Planet. She has made a guest appearance in the hit sitcom Benson and the hit sci-fi fantasy TV series Highlander: The Series.

Film and Television credits include:
Everybody Rides the Carousel, Stage 7, 1976
The Fish That Saved Pittsburgh as Brandy, 1979
Benson as Michelle, 1980
Another Life as Samantha Marshall, 1982
Night Partners as Gloria, 1983
The Wiz as Glinda, the Good Witch of the South (TV version of Broadway Musical), 1983
The Brother from Another Planet as Malverne Davis, 1984
Highlander: The Series as Carolyn Lamb in "The Beast Below" (Season 1, Ep.16), 1993
"Falstaff on the Moon" (short film), 1993
Corps plongés (It's Not About Love) as "la femme au verre du lait", 1998
Go West! A Lucky Luke Adventure as Molly, 2007

Personal life
Bridgewater is the mother to three children, Tulani Bridgewater (from her marriage to Cecil Bridgewater), China Moses (from her marriage to theater, film and television director Gilbert Moses) and Gabriel Durand (from her last marriage to French concert promoter Jean-Marie Durand). Her eldest daughter, Tulani Bridgewater, attended the Mirman School for Gifted Children in Los Angeles, CA. She went on to graduate from the Ecole Active Bilingue in Paris, France at age 16, going on to graduate from Vassar College. She serves as Bridgewater's manager under her firm Bridgewater Artists Management and runs Bridgewater's production company and record label (DDB Productions, Inc. And DDB Records). Daughter China Moses is an accomplished singer, songwriter, producer, radio host and MTV VJ (France). Her critically acclaimed albums have earned her an international reputation as heir to Bridgewater's legacy. Moses tours worldwide, occasionally sharing the bill with Bridgewater.

Awards and honors

Grammy Awards
The Grammy Awards are awarded annually by the National Academy of Recording Arts and Sciences. Bridgewater has won two Grammys with eight nominations.

Other accolades
 First American to be inducted into the Haut Conseil de la Francophonie
Commandeur dans l'Ordre des Arts et des Lettres Award (France)
 Tony Award, Best Featured Actress in a Musical, The Wiz, 1975
Laurence Olivier Award Nomination, Best Actress in a Musical, “Lady Day”, 1987
AUDELCO Award, Outstanding Performance in a Musical-Female, LADY DAY, 2014
ASCAP Foundation Champion Award, 2017
NEA Jazz Masters, 2017
Doris Duke Performing Artist Award, 2018
Thelonious Monk Herbie Hancock Institute of Jazz Maria Fisher Founder's Award, 2018
 - A Life for Jazz Award, Stuttgart Jazz Open, 2019
Memphis Music Hall of Fame, 2019

Discography 

As guest
 Frank Foster – The Loud Minority (Mainstream, 1972)
 Stanley Clarke - Children of Forever (Polydor, 1973)
 Roy Ayers – Coffy (Polydor, 1973) – as Denise Bridgewater
 Buddy Terry – Lean on Him (Mainstream, 1973)
 Norman Connors – Love from the Sun (Buddah, 1974)
 Cecil McBee – Mutima (Strata-East, 1974)
 Charles Sullivan – Genesis (Strata-East, 1974)
 Carlos Garnett — Black Love (Muse, 1974)
 Stanley Clarke – I Wanna Play for You (Nemperor, 1979)
 Hollywood Bowl Orchestra – Prelude to a Kiss: The Duke Ellington Album (Philips Classics, 1996)
 Ray Brown — Some of My Best Friends Are...Singers (Telarc, 1998)
 BWB – Groovin (Warner Bros., 2002)
 Christian McBride – Conversations with Christian (Mack Avenue, 2011)Film soundtrack'''Coffy (Dir. Jack Hill, 1973) — performer: "Coffy Baby", "Coffy Is the Color (Main Title)" - as Denise BridgewaterTry This One for Size (Dir. Guy Hamilton, 1989)The Brother from Another Planet (Dir. John Sayles, 1984) — performer: "Getaway", "Boss of the Block"Présumé dangereux (Dir. Georges Lautner, 1990) — performer: "Turning Round"La Vengeance d'une Blonde (Dir. Jeannot Szwarc, 1994) - performer with Philip Bailey: "People and Places"Monster-in-Law (Dir. Robert Luketic, 2005) — performer: "Into My Soul"Elsa & Fred'' (Dir. Michael Radford, 2014) — performer: "Step 1"

References

External links

 – official site

Dee Dee Bridgewater interview at Rockwired.com

1950 births
Living people
20th-century African-American women singers
African-American jazz musicians
American women jazz singers
American jazz singers
Jazz musicians from Michigan
Musicians from Flint, Michigan
Musicians from Memphis, Tennessee
American expatriates in France
Knights of the Ordre national du Mérite
Grammy Award winners
Michigan State University alumni
Sanremo Music Festival winners
Tony Award winners
Traditional pop music singers
Singers from Michigan
21st-century American women singers
21st-century American singers
Jazz musicians from New York (state)
Jazz musicians from Tennessee
Record producers from Tennessee
Record producers from Michigan
African-American actresses
Verve Records artists
Food and Agriculture Organization
American stage actresses
African-American Catholics
21st-century African-American women singers
Okeh Records artists